Ramanan (Malayalam: രമണന്‍) is the most celebrated work of Malayalam poet Changampuzha Krishna Pillai. It is a play written in the form of verse. It is a pastoral elegy written after the death of his friend, Edappally Raghavan Pillai. Written in 1936, it is the bestseller of Malayalam literature.

Changampuzha's Ramanan became such a big hit, the Kerala University prescribed it as a textbook in Malayalam literature class. Changampuzha himself was a literature student at Kerala University at that time.

Adaptations
 Renowned Katha Prasangam artist Kedamangalam Sadanandan has performed this poem in many stages when Changampuzha was alive.
 In 1967, its film adaptation, Ramanan was released. It was written and directed by D. M. Pottekkat, and starred Prem Nazir, Sheela, Madhu, Kottayam Chellappan, Kamaladevi, Meena, Ramu Kariat, Adoor Bhasi, Usha Kumari and Manavalan Joseph. It was a box office flop.
 This famous poetry has been converted to electronic media as a music album by the Carnatic violinist Edappally Ajith Kumar and vocalist Srivalsan J. Menon with Manorama Music and Santhosh Kumaar Ketteth on the day of 60th death anniversary of the great poet (1911–1948). Prof. M. K. Sanu and Kaithapram Damodaran Namboothiri have launched the Audio CD at an event organised at Changampuzha Samskarika Kendram at Edappally in 2008.

References

Malayalam-language poems
Indian poems

f